Gesù or Gesu may refer to:

 Church of the Gesù, the mother church of the Society of Jesus
Church of the Gesù (disambiguation), other churches with the name
 Jesus in the Italian language
 Gesù Nuovo, a church and a square in Naples, Italy
 Guarneri del Gesù, an Italian luthier from Cremona

See also
 Gesu School, a diverse Catholic elementary school